An incubator is anything that performs or facilitates various forms of incubation, and may refer to:

Biology and medicine
 Incubator (culture), a device used to grow and maintain microbiological cultures or cell cultures
 Incubator (egg), a device for maintaining the eggs of birds or reptiles to allow them to hatch
 Incubator (neonatal), a device used to care for premature babies in a neonatal intensive-care unit

Arts and entertainment
 "Incubator" (Farscape episode), a 2001 episode of the American TV series
 "Incubator", a song by the Israeli rock band, HaClique, in their 1981 album, Ima Ani Lo Rotze Lehigamel 
 Incubator, Kyubey's true identity in the anime TV series Puella Magi Madoka Magica

Other uses
 Business incubator, a company that helps new and startup companies to develop by providing services such as management training or office space
 Apache Incubator, a gateway for open source projects under the Apache Software Foundation
 Wikimedia Incubator, a wiki project hosted by the Wikimedia Foundation

See also
Incubation (disambiguation)